Jean Kickx (17 January 1803, Brussels – 1864) was a Belgian botanist. His father, also known as Jean Kickx (1775–1831) was a botanist and mineralogist; his son Jean Jacques Kickx (1842–1887) was a professor of botany at the University of Ghent.

In 1830 he obtained his PhD at Leuven, later serving as a professor of botany in Brussels (1831–1835) and at the University of Ghent (1835–1864).

The mycological genus Kickxella (order Kickxellales) was named in his honor by Eugène Coumans.

Published works 
In the field of malacology, he published  (with Francis Joseph Adelmann, 1830). Other noteworthy written works by Kickx include:
 , 1835 - Cryptogams found in the vicinity of Louvain, etc.
 , 1841 - Notice involving some mushrooms of Mexico.

References 

1803 births
1864 deaths
Academic staff of Ghent University
19th-century Belgian botanists
Belgian mycologists
Scientists from Brussels